Guinness Peat Group was an investment holding company with interests in Europe, Australia and New Zealand.

History
The company, which had been formed as an investment offshoot of London based investment bank Guinness Mahon in the 1980s, was acquired by Brierley Investments in 1990. The company's shares were listed on the New Zealand Exchange (NZX) in 1991, on the London Stock Exchange (LSE) in 1992 and the Australian Securities Exchange (ASX) in 1993. In 2000, the company spearheaded a campaign to stop the London Stock Exchange from merging with Germany's Deutsche Börse.

Having disposed of its other investments, in March 2015 the company was renamed Coats Group after its remaining subsidiary.

Notes

References

Companies formerly listed on the Australian Securities Exchange
Companies formerly listed on the London Stock Exchange
Companies listed on the New Zealand Exchange
Defunct companies based in London
Holding companies disestablished in 2015
2015 disestablishments in England